McHale's Navy Joins the Air Force is a 1965 film based upon the television 1962–1966 sitcom McHale's Navy.  Series supporting players Joe Flynn and Tim Conway are the leads for this sequel to the first film made in 1964, also named McHale's Navy. Most of the film is based on their two characters, particularly Ensign Parker.

Plot
Binghamton (Joe Flynn) is sent to a staff meeting in Brisbane, Australia and is forced to use the PT-73 to get there after Fuji (Yoshio Yoda) sabotages Lt. Carpenter's (Bob Hastings) PT-116. While in Brisbane, Binghamton orders the PT-73 crew to remain on board, but they switch uniforms with Russian crewmen on the adjoining docked ship so they can leave the ship without being noticed. In a mix-up Parker (Tim Conway) switches uniforms with Lt. Harkness (Ted Bessell), who then is mistakenly arrested by the Russian NKGB and put on the Russian ship, but he later escapes and spends the remainder of the movie trying to get back to his post. Parker impersonates Lt. Harkness, with Binghamton helping him, until Harkness comes back. Because of Harkness' reputation as a lady killer, women are drawn to the very shy Parker. Parker also has to avoid Lt Harkness' father, General Harkness (Tom Tully), for fear of being found out. In the meantime, Harkness (or rather Parker) is promoted three times to Lt. Colonel by unwittingly scoring three military victories. Even after being found out, Parker is by then too big a hero and the military brass decide to cover up the whole mix-up of Parker pretending to be someone else. At the end of the film Parker performs an impressive impersonation of then-President Franklin D. Roosevelt, much to the consternation of his PT-73 crewmates.

Cast

Production
Series star Ernest Borgnine was unavailable due to a scheduling conflict while he appeared in the 1965 film The Flight of the Phoenix. However, in a Cinema Retro interview, Borgnine said the producer Edward Montagne wanted to make the film cheaply, without him and would not show him the script. Carl Ballantine also doesn't appear in the movie and the PT-73 crew is not seen in large portions of the film. The movie, which also features Ted Bessell, was directed by series producer Edward Montagne. Except for Quinton McHale (Ernest Borgnine) and Lester Gruber (Carl Ballantine), the film features all the main characters from the television series.

The film is titled "McHale's Navy Joins the Air Force" and similar designations on the television show are U.S.A.F.  Since the film is situated "Somewhere in the South Pacific, 1943", this would be historically inaccurate. Until 1947 the Air Force was part of the United States Army and from 1941 was known as the United States Army Air Forces (U.S.A.A.F). However, the opposite could be said about the title, as many servicemen colloquially referred to the U.S.A.A.F. as the "Air Force" for short during the time period in which the movie is set.

Release
The film was released in theaters on July 9, 1965 and later to VHS on March 31, 1998.

See also
 List of American films of 1965

References

External links
 
 
 

1964 films
1964 comedy films
American comedy films
American sequel films
Films based on television series
Films directed by Edward Montagne
Films scored by Jerry Fielding
Films set in 1943
Films set in Australia
Military humor in film
Films about the United States Air Force
Films about the United States Navy in World War II
Universal Pictures films
1960s English-language films
1960s American films
McHale's Navy